Dr. Andrea Abrams is an American anthropologist, Associate Professor, President of the Association of Black Anthropologists and Author of God and Blackness: Race, Gender and Identity in a Middle Class Afrocentric Church. Andrea is currently an associate professor of Anthropology, Gender Studies and African American Studies at Centre College in Danville, Kentucky, as well as the Chair of the Gender Studies Program. In 2018, she was named associate vice president for diversity affairs & special assistant to the president, and in 2021 was named vice president for diversity, inclusion, and equity.

Biography 
Abrams completed undergraduate studies at Agnes Scott College, earning a B.A. in sociology and anthropology. Continuing on to receive her M.A. in anthropology, a graduate certificate in women's studies, and a Ph.D. in anthropology from Emory University. Andrea Abrams is the President of the Association of Black Anthropologists (2017–Present). Abrams previously taught at the University of Southern Mississippi, Emory University, Agnes Scott College, and Spelman College.

Research and publications 
Abrams' research focuses on racial an gender issues in the south, specifically studying the discussion and performance of racial identities. Abrams' dissertation work focused on fieldwork in Atlanta,GA, at First Afrikan Presbyterian Church, observing ways that this church defined blackness, expressed their religion and how this intersected with gender and race. Andrea's book God and Blackness: Race, Gender and Identity in a Middle Class Afrocentric Church is a product of her research in Georgia, addressing how African American religious institutions build community and create a shared understanding of blackness. Abrams reports directly on the churches members views on issues of blackness, the middle-class, feminism and identity, and how to navigate the tension of these topics as middle Class African Americans.

In 2014 Abrams shared her experiences, with Colleague Sarah Murray, of their trip and study in Ghana. Abrams and Murray, through a study abroad program in 2013, have taken students from Centre College to Ghana to study the history, culture and environmental issues of the African country.

Personal 
Dr. Andrea Abrams is one of six children born to Reverend Carolyn and Reverend Robert Abrams, originally of Mississippi. Her siblings include U.S. district judge Leslie Abrams Gardner, Richard Abrams, Walter Abrams, Dr. Jeanine Abrams McLean, a former CDC researcher and voting rights advocate, and Stacey Abrams, a lawyer, politician, and voting rights advocate.

References 

Year of birth missing (living people)
Living people
Centre College faculty
Agnes Scott College alumni
Emory University alumni
American anthropologists